There are nine castles in Greater Manchester, a metropolitan county in North West England. They consist of four motte-and-baileys, three fortified manor houses, an enclosure castle, and a possible shell keep. A motte-and-bailey castle has two elements, the motte is an artificial conical mound with a wooden stockade and stronghold on top, usually a stone keep or tower. A bailey is a defended enclosure below the motte, surrounded by a ditch. Motte-and-bailey castles were the most common type of castle in England following the Norman Conquest.  A shell keep was a motte with a stone wall rather than a wooden stockade on top; there would have been no tower within the walls. Four of Greater Manchester's castles are scheduled monuments: Buckton, Bury, Radcliffe Tower, and Watch Hill. A scheduled monument is a "nationally important" archaeological site or historic building, given protection against unauthorised change.

The purpose of a castle was not simply militaristic, but was also considered to be a stamp of authority over the population of an area and a status symbol. Some would have acted as centres of trade and administration for a manor. The earliest castles in Greater Manchester are Dunham and Watch Hill in Trafford, Ullerwood in Manchester, and Stockport Castle in Stockport. They were first recorded in 1173 as belonging to barons who had rebelled against Henry II, and at least three were motte-and-bailey castles, probably because of the speed and ease with which they could be erected. Hamon de Massey, who owned the Trafford castles and Ullerwood, and Geoffrey de Constentyn, who owned Stockport Castle, were two of the three rebels from Cheshire; the other was the Earl of Chester, the owner of Chester Castle. Castles continued to be built in the area, although the last to be built in Greater Manchester were two fortified manor houses near Bury, built more for comfort than as utilitarian military structures. Bury Castle and Radcliffe Tower followed the national trend in the 13th century; they would most likely have acted as the centre of the manor they served.



List of castles
{| class="wikitable sortable" style="font-size:95%;border:0px;text-align:left;line-height:150%;"
|-
! Castle
! Location
! Type
! Constructed
! Scheduled
! class="unsortable" | Notes
|-
|Buckton Castle
|Buckton Hill, Carrbrook
|Enclosure castle
|061180s
|Yes
|Buckton Castle is on Buckton Hill near Carrbrook, overlooking the Tame Valley. Its location possibly allowed the castle to guard the valley. It was probably built by the earls of Chester in the 12th century, and was first referred to in 1360, by which time it was ruinous. The site has been damaged by 18th-century treasure hunters and is close to Buckton Vale Quarry.Grimsditch, Nevell, and Redhead (2007), p. 5.
|-
|Bury Castle
|Bury
|Fortified manor house
|091469
|Yes
|The castle is on a slope overlooking the River Irwell in the centre of modern Bury. It is a fortified manor house constructed from stone and was built for Sir Thomas Pilkington. The castle may have replaced an earlier house on the site, surrounded by a moat. Bury Castle was razed to the ground after the Wars of the Roses when Thomas Pilkington had his land confiscated. The remains, previously buried, have been excavated for public view, forming the centre piece of Castle Square in the town centre.
|-
|Dunham Castle
|Dunham Massey
|Motte
|02Pre-1173
|No
|It was first referred to in 1173 and belonged to Hamon de Massey. Dunham Castle was still standing in 1323 and fell into disuse between then and 1362. The site is surrounded by a moat which has been turned into an ornamental lake. It used to be protected as a scheduled monument, but was delisted as it may be a "natural hummock of glacial sand".
|-
|Manchester Castle
|Manchester
|Fortified manor house
|05Pre-1184
|No
|It is probably located on a bluff where the rivers Irk and Irwell meet, near to Manchester Cathedral, underneath where Chetham's School of Music now is, putting it near the edge of the medieval town of Manchester.Newman (2006), p. 141. It may have originally been a ringwork castle before it became a manor house. First recorded in 1184, in 1215 Manchester Castle was recorded as being held by Gresle, the baron of Manchester, 1243 Robert de Furch. Three rings of ditches have been discovered surrounding the likely site of the castle.
|-
|Radcliffe Tower
|Radcliffe
|Fortified manor house
|091403
|Yes
|Located on Church Street East in Bury, the tower is all that remains of a medieval fortified manor house, built in 1403 and constructed from stone with two towers and a moat. The house was demolished in the 19th century leaving only one remaining tower, which is now a Grade I listed building and a scheduled monument. It was used as a pig sty before being restored.
|-
|Rochdale Castle
|Rochdale
|Motte-and-bailey
|01Early post Norman Conquest
|No
It lay derelict by the early 13th century. Both the motte and bailey are obscured by housing developments.
|-
|Stockport Castle
|Stockport
|Motte-and-bailey
|03Pre-1173
|No
|Stockport Castle is in the town of Stockport on the south side of a valley, overlooking a ford over the River Mersey. It was first referred to in 1173 when Geoffrey de Constentyn held it against Henry II during the barons' rebellion. Stockport Castle was originally constructed with timber and earthwork defences, though these were replaced with stone walls at the start of the 13th century. The castle lay in ruins by 1535 and was demolished in 1775 to be replaced by a cotton mill.Arrowsmith (1997), p. 32. The bailey is located to the south-east of the motte.
|-
|Ullerwood Castle
|Ringway
|Shell keep
|04Pre-1173
|No
|It has been confused with Watch Hill Castle in nearby Bowdon; both probably belonged to Hamon de Massey. Ullerwood Castle was first referred to in 1173 as one of the castles de Massey held against the King. The site is topped by a modern house.
|-
|Watch Hill Castle
|Bowdon
|Motte-and-bailey
|07Probable 12th century
|Yes
|It is located on the border of Bowdon and Dunham Massey. It is unclear when the castle was built, but it was most likely constructed during the late 12th century and belonged to Hamon de Massey. A suggested late 12th century date for the construction of the castle would mean it was probably constructed to aid in the barons' rebellion against Henry II. The castle had fallen out of use by the 13th century.
|}

See also

Castles in South Yorkshire
Castlesteads, Greater Manchester
List of castles in Cheshire
List of castles in England
Scheduled monuments in Greater Manchester

References
Notes

Bibliography

Castles in Cheshire
Castles in Lancashire
History of Greater Manchester
Greater Manchester
Castles